is a Japanese writer and light novel author, best known for creating Ground Control to Psychoelectric Girl and the yuri series Adachi and Shimamura, both of which have received anime and manga adaptations. He is also known for having written Regarding Saeki Sayaka, a light novel spinoff series of Nio Nakatani's manga Bloom Into You. He was born in Gifu Prefecture.

Works

Dengeki Bunko 
  (Illustrator: Hidari)
  (Illustrator: Buriki)
  (Illustrator: Hidari)
  (Illustrator: Buriki)
  (Illustrator: Non)
  (Illustrator: Nio Nakatani)
  (Illustrator: Nio Nakatani)

Media Works Bunko 
 
 
  (Illustrator: Atsuya Uki)
  
  (Illustrator: Atsuya Uki)
  (Illustrator: Hidari)
  (Illustrator: Hidari)
  (Illustrator: Niwa)
  (Illustrator: Atsuya Uki)
  (Illustrator: Non)
  (Illustrator: Nio Nakatani)

References

External links 
Hitoma Iruma's personal website  (archived September 16th, 2019)

20th-century Japanese novelists
21st-century Japanese novelists
1986 births
Light novelists
Living people
Writers from Gifu Prefecture